Brinklow is an unincorporated community in Montgomery County, Maryland, United States. Brinklow has a post office with ZIP code 20862.

The community was named by Hallie Lea, a storekeeper in the late 1880s, most likely for Brinklow in Warwickshire, England.

References

Unincorporated communities in Montgomery County, Maryland
Unincorporated communities in Maryland